The Peresvet class was a group of three pre-dreadnought battleships built for the Imperial Russian Navy around the end of the 19th century.  and  were transferred to the Pacific Squadron upon completion and based at Port Arthur from 1901 and 1903, respectively. All three ships were lost by the Russians in the Russo-Japanese War of 1904–05; Peresvet and Pobeda participated in the Battles of Port Arthur and the Yellow Sea and were sunk during the siege of Port Arthur. Oslyabya, the third ship, sailed to the Far East with the Second Pacific Squadron to relieve the Russian forces blockaded in Port Arthur and was sunk at the Battle of Tsushima with the loss of over half her crew.

Peresvet and Pobeda were salvaged after the Japanese captured Port Arthur and incorporated into the Imperial Japanese Navy. Peresvet was sold back to the Russians during World War I, as the two countries were by now allies, and sank after hitting German mines in the Mediterranean in early 1917 while Pobeda, renamed Suwo, remained instead in Japanese service and participated in the Battle of Tsingtao in late 1914. She became a gunnery training ship in 1917. The ship was disarmed in 1922 to comply with the terms of the Washington Naval Treaty and probably scrapped around that time.

Design and description

After the humiliating Russian defeat during the Crimean War of 1854–55, General Admiral Grand Duke Konstantin Nikolayevich understood that Russia would never be able to outbuild Britain or France, but still needed a maritime strategy that could defend Russia, give the fleet a useful role in peacetime and act as a deterrent. This role placed a premium on high speed and long range at the expense of heavy armament and armor.

As was common with Russian ships of the time, changes were made while the ships were under construction. The most important was the revision of the secondary armament from eight  and five  guns to eleven 6-inch guns and additional light guns. Only two ships were originally planned, but a third was ordered to keep the Baltic Works shipyard busy until a new design could be prepared. Ironically, it was completed before the second ship, despite having been laid down over three years later.

Designed to displace , they were  overweight and actually displaced . To reduce biofouling, the hulls of the first two ships were sheathed with wood and copper, but this was eliminated in Pobeda to reduce weight. The vessels had a partial double bottom and the hull was divided by 10 watertight transverse bulkheads; a centerline bulkhead divided the forward engine rooms. Each crew consisted of 27 officers and 744 enlisted men.

The ships were powered by three vertical triple-expansion steam engines, each driving one propeller shaft, using steam generated by 30 Belleville boilers.

Armament

The ships' main battery consisted of four 45-caliber,  guns mounted in electrically powered twin-gun turrets, one forward and one aft of the superstructure. These guns had major development problems as they proved to be too weak to use a full-strength charge of propellant and had to be reworked and the charge reduced. The guns in Peresvet and Oslyabya were the original model and could be elevated to a maximum of +35°, while the reinforced guns used in Pobeda could only elevate to a maximum of +25°. The guns were designed to fire once every 40 seconds, but in service they fired at half that rate. The ships carried 75 rounds for each gun. The secondary armament of the Peresvet-class ships consisted of eleven 45-caliber, 6-inch Canet Model 1891 quick-firing (QF) guns, 10 mounted in casemates on the sides of the hull and one underneath the forecastle as a bow chaser. Each gun was provided with 220 rounds. They had a range of  when fired at an elevation of +20°.

Smaller guns were carried for close-range defense against torpedo boats. These included 20 quick-firing (QF)  Canet Model 1891 guns. Of these guns, eight were mounted in embrasures in the hull, four on the main deck, four on the battery deck and the last four at the corners of the superstructure on the forecastle deck. The ships carried 300 rounds for each gun. The smaller guns included twenty QF  Hotchkiss guns in hull embrasures and on the superstructure. Each gun had 810 rounds provided. They fired a  shell. Eight  Hotchkiss guns were positioned between the 47-millimeter guns on the forecastle deck.

The Peresvet class had five  torpedo tubes, three of which were above water, one in the bow and one pair of broadside tubes, and two broadside underwater tubes. The ships carried a total of 12 torpedoes. They also carried 45 mines to be laid to protect their anchorage in remote areas.

The ships were fitted with Liuzhol stadiametric rangefinders that used the angle between two vertical points on an enemy ship, usually the waterline and the crow's nest, to estimate the range. The gunnery officer consulted his references to get the range and calculated the proper elevation and deflection required to hit the target. He transmitted his commands via a Geisler electro-mechanical fire-control transmission system to each gun or turret. Oslyabya and the rest of the Second Pacific Squadron were also fitted with Perepelkin telescopic sights for their guns, but their crews were not trained in how to use them.

Protection
The first two ships used Harvey armor for most of their armored vertical surfaces except for the gun turrets and their support tubes, which were made from Krupp armor. Pobeda, however, used Krupp armor for all of her heavy vertical armor. So much of the belt was submerged that Peresvet only had  of armor exposed at normal load; at full load the effect was even greater and the belt was completely submerged. Oslyabya was even more overweight and only had  of her belt armor showing at normal load. The belt in both ships terminated in 7-inch transverse bulkheads, leaving the ends of the ships unprotected. The transverse bulkheads of the waterline belt in Pobeda were eliminated as the belt was extended to the ends of the ship with 4-inch armor plates. Above the waterline belt in all three ships was a shorter strake of armor that protected the middle of the ships. The ends of the upper belt were closed off by 4-inch angled transverse bulkheads.

The face of the casemates for the 6-inch guns was five inches thick and their rears were protected by  armor plates. The casemates at each end of the ships were protected by 5-inch transverse bulkheads. Peresvet had two conning towers, each with sides 6 inches thick, but the other two ships only had a forward conning tower with 9-inch sides. A communications tube 3 inches thick connected each conning tower to the armored deck in all three ships. The flat part of the deck in the central armored citadel consisted of a  plate over the normal 0.75-inch structural steel deck plate; the sloped portion connected to the lower edge of the waterline belt and was 2.5 inches thick. Outside the citadel the armored deck consisted of  plates laid over the  deck plating. On the first two ships the deck armor consisted of mild steel; in Pobeda it was a chrome-nickel steel alloy.

Ships

Careers

Peresvet, named after Alexander Peresvet, a Russian monk who fought against the Golden Horde at the Battle of Kulikovo in 1380, and Pobeda (the Russian word pobeda means "victory") steamed to the Far East almost immediately after entering service in 1901 and 1903 respectively. Upon her arrival, Peresvet became the flagship of the squadron's second-in-command, Rear Admiral Prince Pavel Ukhtomsky. During the Battle of Port Arthur (February 1904) on the second day of the war, Peresvet was not hit, but Pobeda was hit once amidships, sustaining little damage but losing two men killed and four wounded. Pobeda struck a mine during the squadron's sortie on 13 April and remained under repair for almost two months. Both ships had some of their anti-torpedoboat guns and secondary armament removed during the summer to bolster the defenses of the port. They participated in the Battle of the Yellow Sea on 10 August 1904; Pobeda was only lightly damaged by 11 large-caliber hits, but Peresvet, hit 39 times, suffered a considerable amount of flooding. More guns were landed after the squadron's return to Port Arthur, but the Imperial Japanese Army captured the hills overlooking the harbor in November, and this allowed Japanese  siege guns to fire directly at the Russian ships. Pobeda and Peresvet were hit many times, and Pobeda sank on 7 December 1904 from the accumulated damage. Peresvet was scuttled in shallow water on the same day.

Construction of Oslyabya, named after Radion Oslyabya (another monk who had fought at the Battle of Kulikovo), was greatly delayed, and the ship found herself en route to the Far East when the Russo-Japanese War began in February 1904. She was ordered home and assigned to the Second Pacific Squadron that was intended to relieve the forces in Port Arthur. The ship served as the flagship of Rear Admiral Baron Dmitry von Fölkersam, second-in-command of the squadron, but he died two days before the Battle of Tsushima in May 1905. Oslyabya led the Second Division of the squadron during the battle and was the target of numerous Japanese ships during the early part of the battle. Many of the hits on the ship were along the waterline and caused extensive flooding. Efforts to counteract the resulting list destroyed her remaining stability and she sank just over an hour after the Japanese opened fire—the first modern battleship to be sunk solely by gunfire. Sources differ on the exact number of casualties, but the lowest figure given is 471.

In Japanese service

The Japanese raised, repaired, and rearmed Peresvet and Pobeda. They incorporated the refurbished vessels into the Imperial Japanese Navy as Sagami and Suwo, respectively, and reclassified them as first-class coastal defense ships. After the beginning of World War I in 1914, Sagami was sold to Russia in March 1916 and arrived in Vladivostok on 3 April 1916, where she resumed her former name of Peresvet. The Russian Navy intended the ship for service with the Russian Arctic flotilla, and Peresvet sailed for the Arctic, but struck two mines off Port Said, Egypt, on 4 January 1917. The mines, laid by the German submarine , sank Peresvet with the loss of 167 lives after she had caught fire.

During World War I Suwo served as the flagship for the Japanese squadron during the siege of Tsingtao from 27 August to 7 November 1914. The ship served as flagship of the Second Squadron of the Second Fleet in 1915–1916 before becoming a gunnery-training ship for the rest of the war. In April 1922, in compliance with the Washington Naval Treaty, Suwo was disarmed at the Kure Naval Arsenal. During the removal of her armor, the ship capsized on 13 July. She was probably scrapped in 1922–1923, but at least one source suggests she was re-floated and hulked, serving until being broken up at Kure in 1946.

Notes

Footnotes

References
 

 
 
 
 (contact the editor at lars.ahlberg@halmstad.mail.postnet.se for subscription information)

External links

 
 A photogallery of the Peresvet-class battleships

Battleship classes
Peresvet class battleship
Peresvet class battleship
Peresvet class battleship
Peresvet class battleship